Julian Doyle may refer to:
 Julian Doyle (politician)
 Julian Doyle (filmmaker)